Camp Rock Enon or CRE is a Boy Scouts of America resident summer camp for both younger and older youth with high adventure opportunities. The mineral springs of the area afforded the development of a resort in 1856. 89 years later in 1944 the resort and most of the land began the conversion to youth development resources. The summer camp includes familiar outdoor programs like aquatics, camping, cooking, fishing, handicraft, and shooting sports, yet also includes less common programs like canyoneering, rappelling, rock climbing, scuba, space exploration, volleyball, white water rafting, and wilderness survival. The property includes 14 campsites that accommodate from 16 to 56 campers in tents or Adirondack shelters as well as a dining hall that can serve 450 at a time. Units from Maryland, Pennsylvania, Virginia, and West Virginia most often frequent the property.

History

Most of the area history is wrapped around the four (alkaline, saline, chalybeate, and sulphuretted) types of mineral water springs that naturally occur on the land. The area was once called Capper Springs, named for area settler John Capper. On March 24, 1899 the Shenandoah Valley National Bank purchased the property for $3,500. During the summer of 1914 botanists found polypodium vulgare, phegopteris hexagonoptera, adiantum pedatum, pteris aquilina, and cheilanthes lanosa on the property. The idea that soaking in the spring water had medical value was likely a large part of the tourism. In 1917 the Winchester and Western Railroad connected Rock Enon Springs with Winchester, moving both vacationers and supplies with far greater speed. In 1944, when that healing idea was likely no longer generally accepted as true, the Glaize family sold the property to the Shenandoah Area Council who turned what was once a resort into a summer camp. In 1944 the  Miller Lake was created by adding a  earth dam across Laruel Run using equipment owned by the Federal Fish Hatchery in Leestown. In 1958 "walnut, chestnut and persimmon trees" were planted on the property. Today Rock Enon is accredited as both a Cub Scout resident camp and a Boy Scout camp.

Programs
The summer camp programs include: aquatics (swimming, kayaking, stand up paddleboarding, canoeing, rowing, BSA Lifeguard, mile swim, polar bear swim, water carnival, and Aquaglide), backpacking, biking, camp wide games, camping, canyoneering, cooking, CRE elite, Firem'n Chit, Frontier program covering first year camper skills, fishing, handicraft (leatherworking, woodcarving, basketry), high adventure programs, hiking, hiking trails, Indian lore, Mountain Man Program including blacksmithing, nature, orienteering, overnight outpost adventures, Paul Bunyan, pioneering, rock climbing & rappelling on on-site natural rock, the Eight-Face Challenge Rock Climbing Program, safe swim defense, safety afloat, Scoutcraft, shooting sports (archery, rifle, shotgun), Totin' Chip, space exploration, volleyball (sand), wilderness survival, and youth leadership training. Camper family members are invited to visit the camp on Friday nights for dinner; a Scout performed campfire program with skits, songs, and jokes; then an Order of the Arrow Callout Ceremony. Each Sunday evening at the camp chapel a short non-denominational service called Vespers is held. Units from Maryland, Pennsylvania, Virginia, and West Virginia most often frequent the property. The Camp participates in Scouting's International Scout programs, and has had Staff from the United Kingdom, Poland, The Netherlands, Egypt, Mongolia, Mexico, the Dominican Republic, and Columbia in recent years. In 2010 campers spent 9,034 nights at Camp Rock Enon.

Facilities
Each of the 14 campsites contains a bulletin board, campfire circle, cots, flag pole, latrine, pavilion, picnic tables, wash station, and either two person wall tents or Adirondack shelters. At first tents were erected over moveable platforms with guy-lines, now the camp uses permanent metal frame platforms. The Big Oaks site can accommodate 26 campers in tents. The Cooper site can accommodate 20 campers in tents. The Hepner site can accommodate 44 campers in tents. The Hickory Ridge site can accommodate 28 campers in tents. The Hill Top site can accommodate 16 campers in tents, and another 16 in Adirondack shelters. The Indian Village site can accommodate 30 campers in tents. The Laurel Ridge site can accommodate 26 campers in tents. The Pinecrest site can accommodate 36 campers in tents, and another 20 in Adirondack shelters. The Pinnacle site can accommodate 18 campers in tents. The Rowe site can accommodate 20 campers in tents. The Sleepy Hollow site can accommodate 16 campers in tents, and another 16 in Adirondack shelters. The Sutton site can accommodate 24 campers in tents. The Tall Timbers site can accommodate 40 campers in tents, and another 20 in Adirondack shelters. The Zeb site can accommodate 16 campers in tents. Zeb is named for Scoutmaster, Camp Director, Order of the Arrow Shenshawpotoo Lodge cofounder, 77 year Scouting veteran, and Scouting benefactor Ray A. "Zeb" Garrabrandt.

Poland Lodge dining hall, named for Shenandoah Area Council president Bonn A. Poland Sr. who spent weekends using a bulldozer to excavate Miller Lake, can accommodate 450 at a time. The activities building dates back to at least 1989. While all Scout camps include some form of a health lodge, Rock Enon is one of the few that have a medical staff that includes a board certified physician. The camp has a shower house for youth that can accommodate 350 campers and another for adults that can accommodate 100 campers each week. In 2013 the camp planned to add another shower house with commodes near the Molden Shooting Sports area. Other facilities include a handicraft lodge, trading post, and troop lodge.

On June 17, 2013 the camp submitted a site plan for a 0.22 ac. disturbed of an 809.64-ac. parcel for a recreational building to be used by the Order of the Arrow. Camp ranger maintenance projects are often assisted by workers who are a part of the Community Work Force Inmate Program of the Northwestern Regional Adult Detention Center. During the spring of 2015 the camp planned to correct the road wash, dredge Miller Lake, install silt collection ponds upstream, replace the spillway, and update the headwall at drain outlet.
In 2010 the Order of the Arrow worked more than 5,000 service hours at the camp.

Events
In addition to summer camps, the camp hosts other Scouting events. In 1952 the camp added a "new trading post, handicraft lodge, year-around troop lodge and four Adirondack lean-tos" On September 29, 1953 the camp hosted the election of Ben Belchic, who succeeded Bonn A. Poland, to Shenandoah Area Council president. The Shenandoah Area Council held two weekend training sessions at the camp for 45 Scouts selected to represent the council as a troop at the 1969 National Jamboree. One Scout later remembered being asked, “What do you think of the Vietnam situation?” at his interview before inclusion in the delegation. September 29–30, 1945 the camp hosted the first ever Shenandoah Area Council Cub-o-ree. October 16–18, 2015 the camp hosted the Occoquan District Fall Camporee. On January 28, 2017 the camp hosted the Shenandoah Area Council Shawnee District Winter Games. The event held numerous Scout skills competitions and a separate cooking contest. On April 29 and 30, 2017 the camp will host a Girl Scouts Nation's Capital training program for adults to become camp qualified. On April 21–23, 2017 the camp hosted an Emergency Care and Safety Institute Wilderness First Aid class required by high adventure bases and highly recommended for units participating in activities when Emergency Medical Services might be more than one hour away.

The camp has also hosted events not connected to Scouting. In 2015 the camp hosted the Assemblies of God Potomac District Royal Rangers Pow Wow as well as The Quest (a summer camp experience). 580 youth, adult leaders and visitors representing 46 outposts attended the Pow Wow.The Quest included activities at Miller Lake like a canoe race and fishing tournament. Rappelling and shooting sports also proved popular. With the youth rangers in two groups with the Rangers district executive staff in the middle just over 10,000 water balloons were thrown at each other. Friday and Saturday nights featured worship services with the Troy Carver Band and reverend Bobby Basham. Saturday evening also included recognition of the rangers who attending the Junior Leadership Training Academy. The Saturday morning assembly included speaker Chris Basham. April 15–16, 2016 the camp hosted the Grace Downtown of Winchester Men's Spring Retreat.

See also

 Scouting in Maryland
 Scouting in Pennsylvania
 Scouting in Virginia
 Scouting in West Virginia

References

Northeast Region (Boy Scouts of America)
Rock Enon
Buildings and structures in Frederick County, Virginia
1944 establishments in Virginia
Youth organizations based in Virginia
Youth organizations established in 1944